Georges-Jules-Auguste Cain (16 April 1856, Paris - 4 March 1919, Paris) was a French painter, illustrator and writer, who specialized in the history of Paris, its monuments and its theaters.

Biography 
His grandfather, Pierre-Jules Mêne and his father, Auguste Cain were both animal sculptors. He studied with Alexandre Cabanel and Jean-Georges Vibert, but was most heavily influenced by Édouard Detaille. In 1878, he made his debut at the Salon with Fumeur de l'époque Louis XV (Smoker from the Time of Louis XV) and continued to exhibit there on a regular basis until 1900.

He illustrated the Barber of Seville by Beaumarchais and several works by Honoré de Balzac, including La Cousine Bette and La Bourse.

His brother Henri was a famous librettist.

A square in Le Marais, near the Musée Carnavalet, has been named in his honor.

Selected writings in English
 Nooks and Corners of Old Paris, with a preface by Victorien Sardou, translated by Frederick Lawton, E. G. Richards (1907), reprinted by the University of Michigan Library
 Walks in Paris, translated by Alfred Allinson, Macmillan (1909)
 The Byways of Paris, translated by Louise Seymour Houghton, Duffield (1912)

References

External links 

 
 
 Short biography and photograph from Nos peintres et sculpteurs, graveurs, dessinateurs..., Sociétés de Beaux-Arts, (1897) @ Open Library
 ArtNet: More works by Cain
 Illustrations from La Cousine Bette, @ Gallica 
 Books by Cain @ the Library of Congress

1856 births
1919 deaths
French illustrators
French travel writers
19th-century French painters
French male painters
20th-century French painters
20th-century French male artists
19th-century French male artists